Münsingen (Swabian: Mensenga) is a town in the district of Reutlingen, Baden-Württemberg, Germany. It is situated 23 km southeast of Reutlingen, and 37 km west of Ulm.

History
The name Münsingen is probably derived from Alemannic chief called Munigis, who founded a settlement within the present-day city boundaries. In 775, Münsingen was mentioned for the first time on a deed of gift of Lorsch Abbey. The church of Münsingen was first mentioned in 804. The area was under the suzerainty of the Franks. Later, the village was under the suzerainty of county of Württemberg-Urach, who sold it to Ulrich I in 1263.

In 1339, Münsingen was granted Town privileges. After the partition of Württemberg, it came under the purview of Urach, until the re-unification of the County of Württemberg under the auspices of the Treaty of Münsingen in 1482. On October 23, 1654 Münsingen became an administrative center of regional importance. From 1938 to 1973 Münsingen was capital of the district of Münsingen.

In 1895, the German Empire began the construction of a proving ground which later became the Duke-Albrecht-Barracks. On March 31, 2004, the Duke-Albrecht-Barracks was shut down and the ground was converted into a settlement.

Religions
The first mention of church building in Münsingen was in 804 AD. In 1537, the Reformation reached Münsingen and the surrounding villages of Apfelstetten, Auingen, Böttingen, Buttenhausen, Dottingen, Hundersingen, Rietheim and Trailfingen. The Lutheran Church Order was introduced to the Duchy of Württemberg in 1559.

The villages of Bichishausen, Gundelfingen and Bremelau, which are currently administered by Münsingen, used to be part of the Principality of Fürstenberg and Further Austria and due to this historical reason, the inhabitants are mainly Roman Catholic.

Due to the location of village of Magolsheim on the erstwhile border between Württemberg and Further Austria it has both Protestant and Catholic churches to cater to the spiritual needs of the villagers.

Münsingen used to be the seat of the Church District of Münsingen of the Evangelical-Lutheran Church in Württemberg until 1 December 2013 when the neighboring district of Bad Urach was amalgamated with the district of Münsingen to form the Church District Bad Urach-Münsingen.

The Apostolic Church, Baptists, United Methodist Church and the Biblical faith community are also present in Münsingen.

A large Jewish community used to exist in the village of Buttenhausen. The Jews of Buttenhausen were fully integrated into the communal life. This became apparent when during the November 1938 pogrom, the SA squad first had to arrest the mayor of Buttenhausen, who had stubbornly resisted the desecration of the synagogue. Only after his arrest, the SA were able to burn down the synagogue. The remaining Jewish families were deported in the following period and became victims of the Shoah. At the former site of the synagogue, a memorial stone is present. Additionally, in 1961 a memorial was erected in the centre of Buttenhausen with the names of 45 murdered Jewish inhabitants. The Jewish cemetery, Buttenhausen, which was in use from 1787 to 1943, also received a memorial stone.

Münsingen has a mosque which caters to the Turkish-Islamic community. The congregation consists of approximately 70 members as of 2015.

Incorporations

Bichishausen Lauter valley

Dürrenstetten was in 1822 united with Gundelfingen. As part of the municipal reform in Baden-Württemberg the following previously independent municipalities were amalgamated with Münsingen:

 July 1, 1971: Auingen, Böttingen and Dottingen
 January 1, 1974: Apfelstetten and Gundelfingen
 April 1, 1974: Bremelau and Trailfingen
 January 1, 1975: Bichishausen, Buttenhausen Hundersingen, Magolsheim and Rietheim

View on Münsingen

Half-timber house, City of Münsingen

Politics

Council

The council in Münsingen has after the last election 26 members (2014: 24). The local elections in Baden-Württemberg 2019 on May 26, 2019 resulted in the following official results. The turnout was 57,5% (2014: 50,2%). The council consists of the elected honorary councilors and the mayor as chairman. The mayor is entitled to vote in the municipal council.

Mayor
The Mayor is elected for a term of eight years. The term of office of Mike Muenzing ends on 27 November 2021.
 Around 1510: Jakob Ilsenbrand
 Ludwig Neuffer (his daughter Margaretha married Hans Hawysen)
 1587: Hans Hawysen
 - N.N. -(we do not know)
 1900-1922: August Wörner
 1922-1945: Otto Werner
 1945-1949: Eugen Hahn 
 1949-1971: Erwin Volz
 1971-1981: Heinz Kälberer
 1981-1997: Rolf Keller
 since 1997: Mike Münzing SPD

Arms
The blazon coat of arms reads: "In silver a reclining four-ended black deer rod."

Twinning
Münsingen is twinned with the following cities: 

and maintains friendly relations with:

Tourism

Münsingen is located on the Swabian Poet Route, which passes by many sights.

Music
The musical culture Münsingen is mainly borne by the local music clubs. With the trombone choirs in Münsingen, Auingen, Hundersingen-Buttenhausen and Dottingen, the Stadtkapelle Münsingen and the music clubs Böttingen, Magolsheim and Rietheim many clubs are active in the field of Brass Band. There are also several church choirs, as well as the secular singer Communities "Liederkranz Münsingen" Männergesangsverein Apfelstetten, Sängerbund Buttenhausen, Liederkranz Dottingen, Liedertafel Hundersingen, men's glee club Trailfingen and the chorus of EJW district Münsingen.

Buildings
Featured buildings in Münsingen are the historic Old Town Hall from 1550, and its successor, the New Town Hall in timbered house style, which was built in 1935–1937. The "old stock" as a historical site with more than 140 buildings for up to 5200 soldiers. Also worth seeing are the market fountain and the Martin Church, completed in 1495 by Peter of Koblenz.

In Buttenhausen district Castle Buttenhausen and also a Jewish Cemetery. In addition, several ruins exist in Lautertal, for example the Castle Hohenhundersingen.

Towers
In the peripheral area of the former military training area Münsingen are four Towers of Swabian Albverein (Swabian Alp Association), which are all freely accessible (key deposit).
 The 42 m high 'Hursch Tower' 'is about 1.5 km southwest of Römerstein-Zainingen and was erected in 1981.
 The 20 m high 'Waldgreutturm' 'is 2 km southeast of Römerstein-Zainingen and was erected in 1981.
 The 30 m high 'Heroldstatt Tower' 'is about 2 km north-west of Heroldstatt - Ennabeuren and was erected in 1981.
 The  8 m high 'Sternberg Tower' 'is not far northeast of the Münsinger district Böttingen and was erected in 1900 originally as a windmill .

Museums
Münsingen museums are the memorial site Matthias Erzberger in Buttenhausen, the Jewish Museum Buttenhausen, the local history museum in the  Old Palace , the museum for former military training area in the "old camp" at Auingen. The museum  Anton Geiselhart  and the castle museum are located in Gundelfingen.

Regular events
 On 1 May, regularly organized by Luftsportverein Münsingen, the international vintage and steam engines meeting takes place. Every year there are about 600 motorcycles, Lanz Bulldogs, steam engines, vintage aircraft and more. 
 Every summer takes place in the streets of the old town instead of the city festival, which - with musical entertainment - especially thrives on the commitment of numerous Münsingen clubs.

Economy and infrastructure

Established Businesses
The Uralan polymer processing is located in the industrial area West. In addition, the Walter AG and Volksbank Münsingen have a seat here.

Traffic
The Bundesstraße B 465 coming from Bad Urach comes through the town and runs to Ehingen and Biberach an der Riss. The national road 230 runs through the urban area in east–west direction and connects the region to the Federal Highway 8 in Merklingen.
The Public transport is guaranteed by the Verkehrsverbund Neckar-Alb-Donau (NALDO). The community is located in the comb 225. The Münsingen station, is located on the Reutlingen–Schelklingen railway. On Sundays and holidays from early April to late October regional trains and special trains bring mainly hikers and sightseers to their destination. In addition, throughout the year goes from Monday to Friday, some regional trains direction Ulm or direction Gomadingen.
Since early 2008 Münsingen is connected with a transition tariff also to the Donau-Iller-Nahverkehrsverbund (DING).

Media 
The daily  Alb-Bote , which is part of the Südwest Presse in Ulm reports daily on what is happening in and around Münsingen. Also, the  Reutlinger General Anzeiger  is represented in Münsingen.

Court

Münsingen has a District Court, which belongs to the District Court Tübingen and Higher Regional Court Stuttgart.

With the gymnasium Münsingen, the Gustav Mesmer - Realschule, the high school with Werkrealschule  Schillerschule , the primary school  primary school at Hardt  in the district Auingen, primary school Dottingen, primary school  Lautertalschule  and the primary school   Astrid Lindgren school  all general education forms are represented in the town.

Besides, there are the Gustav-Heinemann-School (special school), the  Erich Kaestner school, (Sprachheilschule), the Karl-Georg-Haldenwang -School for the mentally handicapped and the branch office of the physically disabled school Mössingen also four special schools.

The range is supplemented by the Vocational School Münsingen.

For the youngest inhabitants there are seven municipal, five Protestant  and Roman Catholic kindergarten and two small nurseries.

Sons and daughters of the town

 Jacob Lorhard (1561–1609) a German philosopher and pedagogue based in St. Gallen, Switzerland
 Johannes Scholl (1827–1916) a German-American woodcarver, known for only using a jackknife and paint 
 Lehmann Bernheimer (1841-1918) a German antique dealer, who built the Bernheimer-Haus in Munich. 
  (1869-1943) Württembergian official
 Matthias Erzberger (1875-1921) a German publicist and politician, Reich Minister of Finance 1919-1920 
  (1876 or 1879 - 1944 in Theresienstadt), educational reformer and victim of the Holocaust
 Erwin Nestle (1883-1972) a German scholar, theologian and philologist
 Max Kommerell (1902-1944), literary scholar and poet
 Johannes Hölz (1906–1945) a highly decorated Generalmajor in the Wehrmacht during World War II
  (1925-2005), aviation pioneer, fighter pilot and founder of Südflug International
  (1929-2012), Evangelical Lutheran theologian and professor of theology
  (born 1952), politician, district chief executive of Alb-Donau-Kreis 2005-2016
 Gabriele Rauscher (born 1970) a German freestyle skier
 Andreas Glück (born 1975) politician and surgeon
 Dirk Schrade, (born 1978), eventer, gold medallist at the 2012 Summer Olympics

International relations

Münsingen, Germany is twinned with:

See also
 Jewish cemetery, Buttenhausen

References

External links
French army training camp 
Truppenübungsplatz Münsingen
Official website of Münsingen

Towns in Baden-Württemberg
Reutlingen (district)
Holocaust locations in Germany
Württemberg